The Netherlands cricket team toured Ireland from 11 to 18 August 2010. The tour consisted of one Intercontinental Cup Match and two One Day Internationals (ODIs).

Intercontinental Cup Match

ODI series

1st ODI

2nd ODI

External links
Netherlands tour of Ireland 2010 on Cricinfo

2010 in cricket
2010 in Irish cricket
International cricket tours of Ireland
International cricket competitions in 2010
Ireland